Yang Yanqin (born August 28, 1966) is a former female shot put athlete from China. She competed at the 1984 Summer Olympics in Los Angeles, California, finishing in tenth place (16.97 metres) in the overall-rankings. She was the youngest member (17 years, 341 days) at those Games of the Chinese track and field delegation.

References
sports-reference

1966 births
Living people
Athletes (track and field) at the 1984 Summer Olympics
Chinese female shot putters
Olympic athletes of China
Universiade medalists in athletics (track and field)
Universiade silver medalists for China
20th-century Chinese women